Sant Ram Singla is an Indian politician. He was elected to the Lok Sabha, lower house of the Parliament of India as a member of the Indian National Congress.

References

External links
 Official biographical sketch in Parliament of India website

India MPs 1991–1996
Lok Sabha members from Punjab, India
Indian National Congress politicians
1934 births
2005 deaths
People from Patiala district